MAV may refer to:

Micro air vehicle, a type of remotely controlled unmanned aerial vehicle
Mojave Aerospace Ventures, the holding company for the SpaceShipOne space flight effort
Migraine-associated vertigo, vertigo or dizziness associated with migraine headache
 Municipal Association of Victoria
 MAV, stage name for Swedish country singer Anders Lundström
 Magyar Államvasutak (MÁV), the Hungarian national railway company Hungarian State Railways
 MAV, Minoan Air ICAO code
 MAV or Mars Ascent Vehicle:
 A component of the NASA-ESA Mars sample-return mission
 The lander in the novel The Martian and 2015 film based on the book
 M.A.V. (video game)

See also 
 Mavs, nickname for the Dallas Mavericks